Maria Neustift is a municipality in the district of Steyr-Land in the Austrian state of Upper Austria.

Geography
Maria Neustift lies in the Traunviertel. About 32 percent of the municipality is forest, and 63 percent is farmland.

References

Cities and towns in Steyr-Land District